Roman Savvin (born 2 June 1972) is a former Russian football player.

References

1972 births
Living people
Soviet footballers
Russian footballers
FC Fakel Voronezh players
Russian Premier League players
FC Znamya Truda Orekhovo-Zuyevo players

Association football defenders